The fallen angel is a gin cocktail.

The ingredients include gin, green creme de menthe, Angostura bitters, and lemon or lime juice.

References

Cocktails with gin
Cocktails with Angostura bitters